Ahmet Robenson (born Peel Harold Robinson; 1889 – 1 January 1968) was a Turkish football player and physical education teacher at Galatasaray High School, who is known for his active role in the development of sports in Turkey.

Biography
He was born in Kalimpong, British Raj (modern day India). He lived most of his life in Istanbul and died in New York, United States. Ahmet had two brothers, Yakup and Abdurrahman, who were also interested in sports, however they were killed in action in World War I whilst fighting for the Ottomans against the British in the Sinai front.

After graduating from Galatasaray High School, Robenson was interested in new sports which were not recognized in his country at the time. He is known as being the first organizer of basketball, hockey, tennis, and Scouting activities in his time. He mostly introduced these new sports to his students in Galatasaray High School.

Robenson was also the goalkeeper of the Galatasaray football team, who won the Istanbul League title in 1909.

He later became Galatasaray S.K. president in 1926, and Galatasaray won the Istanbul League once again.

Scouting
The start of Scouting in Turkey is attributed to brothers Ahmet and Abdurrahman Robenson, who were sports teachers at the Galatasaray and Istanbul high schools in Istanbul in 1912, and to Nafi Arif Kansu and Ethem Nejat, with the first units organized at Darüşşafaka, Galatasaray, and İstanbul high schools, during the late Ottoman period.

Honours
Galatasaray SK
Istanbul Football League: 1908–1909, 1909–1910, 1910–1911

See also
List of one-club men
List of Galatasaray S.K. presidents

References

 Tekil, S. (1986). History of Galatasaray, 1905–1985, page (24). Galatasaray Spor Kulübü. 
 Tekil, S. (1983). Galatasaray 1905–1982: Memories, page (303). Arset Matbaacılık Koll. Şti. 

Galatasaray S.K. footballers
Galatasaray S.K. presidents
1880s births
1968 deaths
Emigrants from British India to the Ottoman Empire
Scouting pioneers
Scouting and Guiding in Turkey
Footballers from Liverpool
Association football goalkeepers
Turkish footballers